The 2022 Club de Foot Montréal season is the club's 29th season of existence, and their 11th in Major League Soccer, the top tier of the American soccer pyramid.

In addition to competing in the MLS, the Club will also work to defend their Canadian Championship title from 2021 as well as competing in the 2022 CONCACAF Champions League.

Current squad
Source, As of September 6, 2022:

International roster slots 
Montreal currently has six MLS International Roster Slots for use in the 2022 season. Montreal has eight slots allotted from the league and sold one to Orlando City SC and one to LAFC. In addition, starting in 2022, CF Montreal are allowed to make three international players exempt from status if they have been on the roster for more than one year.

Management

 Owner —  Joey Saputo
 Sporting director —  Olivier Renard
 Global sporting director —  Walter Sabatini
 Assistant sporting director —  Vassili Cremanzidis
 Director of academy —  Patrick Leduc

Coaching staff

  Wilfried Nancy – head coach
  Kwame Ampadu – assistant coach
  Laurent Ciman – assistant coach
  Francesco Morara – assistant coach
  Romuald Peiser – goalkeeping coach
  Jules Gueguen – fitness coach
  Maxime Chalier - video analyst

Player movement

In 
Per Major League Soccer and club policies terms of the deals do not get disclosed.

Out

Loans in

Loans out

Draft picks

International caps 
Players called for senior international duty during the 2022 season while under contract with the CF Montréal.

Friendlies

Review

Pre-Season 
Unless otherwise noted, all times in EST

Major League Soccer Regular Season

Results

Tables

Eastern Conference

Overall

Results summary

Matches
Unless otherwise noted, all times in Eastern Time

Major League Soccer Playoffs

Bracket

Note: The higher seeded teams host matches, with the MLS Cup host determined by overall points.

Results

Canadian Championship

Bracket

Canadian Championship results

Quarter-final

Semi-final

CONCACAF Champions League

Bracket

Round of 16

Quarter-finals

Statistics

Appearances, Minutes Played, and Goals Scored

Top scorers

{| class="wikitable sortable alternance"  style="font-size:85%; text-align:center; line-height:14px; width:85%;"
|-
!width=10|Rank
!width=10|Nat.
! scope="col" style="width:275px;"|Player
!width=10|Pos.
!width=80|MLS
!width=80|Canadian Championship
!width=80|Champions League
!width=80|MLS Cup Playoffs
!width=80|TOTAL
|-
|1||  || Romell Quioto                              || FW ||15|| || 1|| ||16
|-
|2||  || Djordje Mihailovic                         || MF ||9 || || 1||2||12
|-
|3||  || Kei Kamara                                 || FW ||9 || ||  || ||9
|-
|4||  || Zachary Brault-Guillard                    || DF ||4 || ||  || ||4
|-
|4||  || Alistair Johnston                          || DF ||4 || ||  || ||4
|-
|4||  || Ismaël Koné|| MF ||2 || || 1||1||4
|-
|7||  || Joaquín Torres || FW ||3 || ||  || ||3
|-
|7||  || Sunusi Ibrahim                             || FW ||  ||3||  || ||3
|-
|7||  || Joel Waterman                              || DF ||3 || ||  || ||3
|-
|7||  || Lassi Lappalainen                         || FW ||3 || ||  || ||3
|-
|11||  || Rudy Camacho                              || DF ||1 || || 1|| ||2
|-
|11||  || Mathieu Choinière                         || MF ||2 || ||  || ||2
|-
|11||  || Mason Toye                                || MF ||2 || ||  || ||2
|-
|11||  || Kamal Miller                              || DF ||2 || ||  || ||2
|-
|15||  || Matko Miljevic                            || MF ||1 || ||  || ||1
|-
|15||  || Victor Wanyama                            || MF ||1 || ||  || ||1
|-
|- class="sortbottom"
| colspan="4"|Totals|| 61 || 3  ||4 ||3||71

Italic: denotes player left the club during the season.

Top Assists 

{| class="wikitable sortable alternance"  style="font-size:85%; text-align:center; line-height:14px; width:85%;"
|-
!width=10|Rank
!width=10|Nat.
! scope="col" style="width:275px;"|Player
!width=10|Pos.
!width=80|MLS
!width=80|Canadian Championship
!width=80|Champions League
!width=80|MLS Cup Playoffs
!width=80|TOTAL
|-
|1||  || Kei Kamara                                  || FW ||7 ||1|| || ||8
|-
|1||  || Joaquín Torres  || FW ||7 || ||1|| ||8
|-
|1||  || Djordje Mihailovic                          || MF ||6 || ||1||1||8
|-
|4||  || Lassi Lappalainen                           || FW ||7 || || || ||7
|-
|4||  || Romell Quioto                               || FW ||6 || ||1|| ||7
|-
|6||  || Alistair Johnston                           || DF ||5 || || || ||5
|-
|6||  || Victor Wanyama                              || MF ||5 || || || ||5
|-
|6||  || Ismaël Koné || MF ||5 || || || ||5
|-
|9||  || Samuel Piette                               || MF ||3 || ||1|| ||4
|-
|9||  || Joel Waterman                               || DF ||4 || || || ||4
|-
|9||  || Matko Miljevic                              || FW ||1 ||3|| || ||4
|-
|9||  || Zachary Brault-Guillard                     || DF ||3 || || ||1||4
|-
|13||  || Kamal Miller                               || DF ||3 || || || ||3
|-
|14||  || Mathieu Choinière                          || MF ||1 || ||1|| ||2
|-
|15||  || Sunusi Ibrahim                             || FW ||1 || || || ||1
|-
|15||  || Jojea Kwizera                              || FW ||1 || || || ||1
|-
|15||  || Ahmed Hamdy     || MF ||1 || || || ||1
|-
|- class="sortbottom"
| colspan="4"|Totals|| 65 || 4  ||4 ||2||75

Italic: denotes player left the club during the season.

Goals Against Average 

{| class="wikitable" style="font-size: 95%; text-align: center;"
|-
! rowspan="2" style="width:1%"|No.
! rowspan="2" style="width:90px"|Nat.
! rowspan="2" style="width:25%"|Player
! colspan="3" |Total
! colspan="3" |Major League Soccer
! colspan="3" |Canadian Championship
! colspan="3" |CONCACAF Champions League
! colspan="3" |MLS Cup Playoffs
|-
!MIN!!GA!!GAA!! MIN!!GA!!GAA!! MIN!!GA!!GAA!! MIN!!GA!!GAA!! MIN!!GA!!GAA
|-
| 1
|
| style="text-align: left;" |Sebastian Breza
|2430
|41
|1.52
|2070
|38
|1.65
|0
|0
|0.00
|360
|3
|0.75
|0
|0
|0.00
|-
| 25
|
| style="text-align: left;" |Logan Ketterer
|0
|0
|0.00
|0
|0
|0.00
|0
|0
|0.00
|0
|0
|0.00
|0
|0
|0.00
|-
|41
|
| style="text-align: left;" |James Pantemis
|1350
|19
|1.27
|990
|12
|1.09
|180
|4
|2.00
|0
|0
|0.00
|180
|3
|1.50

Italic: denotes player left the club during the season.

Clean sheets 

{| class="wikitable sortable alternance"  style="font-size:85%; text-align:center; line-height:14px; width:85%;"
|-
!width=10|No.
!width=10|Nat.
! scope="col" style="width:225px;"|Player
!width=80|MLS
!width=80|Canadian Championship
!width=80|CONCACAF Champions League
!width=80|MLS Cup Playoffs
!width=80|TOTAL
|-
|1||   || Sebastian Breza               ||3  ||   || 1|| ||4
|-
|25||   || Logan Ketterer               ||  ||   || || ||
|-
|41||  || James Pantemis                ||4  || 1   || ||1 ||6
|-
|- class="sortbottom"
| colspan="3"|Totals|| 7 || 1  || 1 || 1 || 10

Italic: denotes player left the club during the season.

Top minutes played 

{| class="wikitable sortable alternance"  style="font-size:85%; text-align:center; line-height:14px; width:80%;"
|-
!width=10|No.
!width=10|Nat.
!scope="col" style="width:275px;"|Player
!width=10|Pos.
!width=80|MLS
!width=80|Canadian Championship
!width=80|CONCACAF Champions League
!width=80|MLS Cup Playoffs
!width=80|TOTAL
|-
|2 ||  || Victor Wanyama                              || MF ||2636 ||  || 360||180 ||3176
|-
|16||  || Joel Waterman                               || DF ||2673 ||90|| 244||161 ||3168
|-
|22 || || Alistair Johnston                           || DF ||2648 ||90|| 195||180 ||3113
|-
|4 ||  || |Rudy Camacho                               || DF ||2480 ||90|| 238||170 ||2988
|-
|3||   || Kamal Miller                                || DF ||2398 ||  || 212||180 ||2880
|-
|8 ||  || Djordje Mihailovic                          || MF ||2010 ||  || 357||180 ||2547
|-
|1||   || Sebastian Breza                             || GK ||2070 ||  || 360||    ||2430
|-
|30||  || Romell Quioto                               || FW ||2054 ||76|| 255||36  ||2421
|-
|21||  || Lassi Lappalainen                           || FW ||1942 ||  || 296||161 ||2399
|-
|28||  || Ismaël Koné || MF ||1587 ||90|| 236||159 ||2072
|-

Italic: denotes player left the club during the season.

Yellow and red cards

Recognition

MLS All-Star

MLS Player of the Week

MLS team of the Week

Concacaf WCQ Matchday Best XI

Concacaf Champions League Matchday Best XI

World Cup 2022 Rosters

Notes

References 

CF Montréal seasons
Montreal Impact
Montreal Impact
Montreal Impact
Montreal